The IWRG 17th Anniversary Show was an annual professional wrestling major event produced by Mexican professional wrestling promotion International Wrestling Revolution Group (IWRG), which took place on January 1, 2013 in Arena Naucalpan, Naucalpan, State of Mexico, Mexico. The main event was a lucha libre special stipulation match, the Relevos Suicidas Tag Team match. In a Relevos Suicida match the first two wrestlers pinned are forced to wrestle against each other with a wager on the line. In the main event the teams consisted of rivals Oficial 911 and El Ángel teaming up to take on Oficial Factor and Hijo de Pirata Morgan who had been rivals as well. Each wrestler would risk something in case they lost; 911 would risk his wrestling mask, El Angel the IWRG Intercontinental Middleweight Championship, Factor risked the IWRG Rey del Ring Championship and Hijo de Pirata Morgan would risk the IWRG Junior de Juniors Championship if he was pinned in the tag team match. On the under card a team representing IWRG's Naucalpan based wrestling school (Alan Extreme, Black Terry, Carta Brava, Jr., Dinamic Black, Eita, Golden Magic, Imposible and Saruman) facing a team representing Fuerza Guerrera's Gimnasio Konkreto  (Guerrera, Arana de Plata, Fleeyzer, John Crazy, King Boy, Mr. Leo, Rey Espacial and Rey Tabu). The show featured three additional matches.

Production

Background
The 2013 International Wrestling Revolution Group (IWRG; Sometimes referred to as Grupo Internacional Revolución in Spanish) anniversary show commemorated the 17th anniversary of IWRG's creation as a wrestling promotion and holding their first show on January 1, 1996. The Anniversary show, as well as the majority of the IWRG shows in general are held in "Arena Naucalpan", owned by the promoters of IWRG and their main arena. The Anniversary Shows generally take place on January 1 each year whenever possible.

Storylines
The event featured six professional wrestling matches with different wrestlers involved in pre-existing scripted feuds, plots and storylines. Wrestlers were portrayed as either heels (referred to as rudos in Mexico, those that portray the "bad guys") or faces (técnicos in Mexico, the "good guy" characters) as they followed a series of tension-building events, which culminated in a wrestling match or series of matches.

Results

References

External links 
 

2013 in professional wrestling
2013 in Mexico
17
January 2013 events in Mexico